Chatteris  is a market town and civil parish in the Fenland district of Cambridgeshire, England, situated in The Fens between Huntingdon, March and Ely. The town is in the North East Cambridgeshire parliamentary constituency.

The parish of Chatteris is large, covering 6,099 hectares, and for much of its history was a raised island in the low-lying wetland of the Fens. Mentioned in the Domesday Book of 1086, the town has evidence of settlement from the Neolithic period. After several fires in the 18th and 19th centuries, the majority of the town's housing dates from the late Victorian period onwards, with the tower of the parish church the only medieval building remaining.

Following the draining of the Fens, beginning in the 17th century and completed in the 19th century, the town's economy has been based on agriculture and related industry. Due to its proximity to Cambridge, Huntingdon and Peterborough, the town has emerged as a commuter town. The town had a population of 11,011 at the time of the United Kingdom Census 2021.

History

Toponymy and early history 
Chatteris's name probably derives from the Celtic Cedrid – Ced meaning a wood and Rid, a ford, although it may also derive from "cader", meaning hill fort, suggesting a similar site to the nearby Stonea Camp. The town was mentioned in the Domesday Book as "Cetriz" and "Cateriz".

Archaeological evidence has been found of Neolithic, Bronze Age and Iron Age settlements in the area, and Chatteris possesses what has been interpreted as the only upstanding Neolithic boundaries in Fenland. Saxon evidence is less well preserved, although in 679, Hunna, the chaplain to Æthelthryth of Ely built a hermitage on Honey Hill. More apocryphically, Chatteris is reputed to have been the last refuge of Boudica as she fled from the Romans.

Medieval period 

The miraculous story of the first known parishioner of the town, Bricstan, is documented in the Historia Ecclesiastica by the Chronicler Orderic Vitalis (1075 – c.1142). According to the legend, Bricstan was a pious free tenant from the town who had joined the monastery at Ely Cathedral in 1115 to begin training as a monk. However, he was accused of theft and imprisoned in London. The legend recounts that one night he had a vision of Saint Etheldreda coming towards him, and as if by a miracle, his heavy chains fell from him and he was shackled no longer. When he awoke from his dream, he discovered that this was indeed true and he was free of his chains. The wife of Henry I, Matilda of Scotland, heard of the miracle, and she assured herself that he was no rogue or thief, issued a writ of pardon and declared him a free man.

During the Medieval period, the town was dominated by Chatteris Abbey, a small Benedictine nunnery dedicated to St Mary, built in 980 by Eadnoth the Younger for Aelfwyn or Alfwen the niece of King Edgar and one of only eight nunneries mentioned in the Domesday Book. The first abbess of Chatteris was Eadnoth's sister, Aelfwyn. Throughout its existence, the abbey was comparatively poor compared to other foundations, due to a lack of royal patronage and a consequent lack of tithe estates. As a result, the abbey survived the first wave of closures during the Dissolution of the Monasteries, but was surrendered to the king's commissioners in 1538, by which time there were eleven nuns in residence.

At this date fourteen local families still used the abbey church as parochial but this, unusually, did not save it from demolition, the parishioners being transferred to nearby St Peter and St Paul's Church in the area. It has been conjectured that due to the short space between them, the parish church may have been the abbey church, although Claire Breay's Cartulary of Chatteris Abbey discounts this idea, citing that historical documentation clearly defines two separate churches. A range of the cloister buildings survived as part of a mansion known as Park House. This was demolished in 1847 and the site has now completely vanished beneath streets and housing, although the "Park Streets" of Chatteris mark the boundary of its walls and several buildings contain stone originating from the abbey. A large portion of the town was destroyed by a great fire in 1310, which destroyed the nunnery and a large portion of the church, leaving only sections of the base of the tower.

Early modern and contemporary 

Later fires in 1706 and 1864 destroyed most medieval and Georgian architecture, and a large proportion of the town's listed buildings date from the Victorian period onwards. However, many of the pasture fields on the outskirts of the town have evidence of ridge and furrow farming practices, although these are under threat by current building proposals.

To the north of the town runs the Forty Foot Drain, a large river also called Vermuyden's Drain, after the Dutch engineer whose name is associated with the fen drainage works of the middle of the 17th century. Several of the older buildings of the town show evidence of the Dutch architectural style.

Chatteris is a market town and has possessed this designation since 1834, although an earlier market existed in the town, which was discontinued due to poor roads in 1808. A small market is still held every Friday.

Following the Beeching Axe, Chatteris railway station, formerly on the St Ives extension of the Great Eastern Railway, was closed in March 1967.<ref>Kelly's Directory of Cambridgeshire , (London: Kelly's Directories Limited, 1900), pp.99.</ref> The station buildings no longer exist.

 Geography 
Chatteris is situated between Huntingdon, St Ives, Peterborough, March and Ely, in the middle of The Fens—the lowest-lying area in the United Kingdom—with most of the land surrounding the town being below sea level, although the highest point in the Fens (36 feet above sea level) is within Chatteris's parish boundaries. The peaty land surrounding the town is largely used for agriculture, drained by numerous ditches and dykes, and there are two large drainage rivers near the town – the Forty Foot Drain, also known as Vermuyden's Drain, and the Sixteen Foot Drain.

Chatteris is a key turning point on the A141 road (known as the Isle of Ely way) and the starting point of the A142 road to Ely and Suffolk (known as Ireton's Way). The town also has important links to Cambridge and the A14 via the B1050 to Bar Hill. The town centre traffic was bypassed in 1986, with the disused route of the former St Ives extension of the Great Eastern Railway being used to build the A141 to March and Guyhirn.

 Climate 
There are no Met Office recording stations in the Fens, but an indication of rainfall and temperature of the county town Cambridge on the edge of the Fens shows that rainfall is below the national average, and in a wider study of East Anglia, the region had temperatures comparable with London, the warmest part of the UK.

 Politics 
 Governance 

The lowest level of local government is Chatteris Town Council, this consists of the following electoral wards: Birch; Slade Lode; The Mills and Wenneye.
The town is also governed by Fenland District Council. The town is part of the North East Cambridgeshire parliamentary seat, whose Member of Parliament is currently the Conservative Steve Barclay.

The town is historically part of the Isle of Ely, once under the secular jurisdiction of the Bishop of Ely, a power ended by the Liberty of Ely Act, 1837. After various changes throughout the 19th and 20th centuries, following the recommendations of the Local Government Commission for England, on 1 April 1965 the bulk of the area was merged to form Cambridgeshire and Isle of Ely, and following the Local Government Act 1972, Chatteris has been part of the wider Cambridgeshire County Council since 1974.

 Law and criminal justice 

Under the Police Act 1964 and local government reform in 1974, the Isle of Ely Constabulary became part of the Mid-Anglia Constabulary until the present Cambridgeshire Constabulary was formed in 1974. A small police station is situated in East Park Street, but it is no longer open to the public.

The most frequently reported crimes in Chatteris are "Anti-Social Behaviour" and "Violent and Sexual Offences".

 Economy 
Overview
Chatteris is sited in particularly fertile agricultural land, and as such, the town's local economy is largely based on this industry. Alan Bartlett and Sons Ltd, a major British grower and packer of root vegetables has a large facility in the town with over 2,500 hectares under cultivation, much of it growing parsnips and the Chantenay and Bushytops carrot. The company is a demerger of Albert Bartlett & Sons, which are now based in Scotland. Rustler Produce Ltd, also based in Chatteris, is another major player in this industry, and a number of smaller vegetable producers and processors operate in the Chatteris area.

Another major employer in the town is Metalcraft (Stainless Metalcraft (Chatteris) Ltd). The company was established in the town in the late 19th century and over the years has manufactured diamond mining equipment and overhead cranes. The company is now part of the Avingtrans Group and specialises in creating engineered products for the oil, gas, nuclear and medical industries.

An Aldi supermarket located on Bridge Street opened in 2016. It was formerly a large Co-op which opened in 1990, trading under a variety of brandnames until its closure in 2014.

Another supermarket constructed on the A141 Fenland Way became the first of Tesco's discount Jack's-branded stores in the UK and hosted the press launch on 19 September 2018, opening to the public the following day. It is located within a larger building intended as a Tesco supermarket, constructed at a cost of £22 million but left mothballed following the company's decision to halt the opening of 49 out-of-town supermarkets following poor financial results in October 2014. The other half opened as a Poundstretcher store in February 2018.

The traditional town centre stretches from Park Street through Market Hill to the High Street and
generally features more specialist non-branch shops. The town centre has a post office but no banks following the closure of Barclays in 2019. The Petrou Brothers fish and chip shop in West Park Street won the 2006 National Fish and Chip Shop of the Year competition; the owners were presented with the award by chef Ainsley Harriott.

The Cross Keys, The George Inn and The Bramley House are the town's main hotel and bed-and-breakfast establishments, all located in the High Street or Market Hill. In addition to the Cross Keys and George, there are two further pubs; The Ship in Bridge Street and The Honest John in South Park Street, and a number of small restaurants and tea shops. There are several members' clubs including the Working Men's Club in Station Street and the Conservative Club in King Edward Street which feature live music and other entertainment. Fensport, a workshop specialised in performance and tuning parts for Toyota sports cars like Celica and Toyota 86 is located in Dock Road.

 Transport 
Chatteris was well served by local bus routes, with regular buses to the nearby towns of March, St Ives, Ely and the city of Cambridge.  There are also occasional services to Huntingdon and Peterborough. However the decline in bus usage associated with Covid and more generally has led to the potential ending of all services.

The nearest railway stations are in March and Manea.

 Demographics
The United Kingdom Census 2011 found the population of Chatteris to be 10,453. This was an increase of 1163 since 2001 which recorded 8,820 people living in 3,809 households, with the average number of people per dwelling 2.31. The 2001 census found that 98.9% of the population of the town were of the white ethnic group. The parish of Chatteris is large, covering 6,099 hectares, equalling an average population density of 1.45, although most of the dwellings are concentrated in a smaller area, the outskirts of the town consisting of farmland. 99.6% of residents lived in households, the remaining 0.4% lived in communal establishments.

 Ethnic groups 
The majority of the population in Chatteris state their ethnic group as "White". At 97.2% this is higher than the average of 94.1 for England and Wales. Since 2011 diversity in Chatteris has increased slightly and all ethnic groups have increased in size except for "Other" but this is likely due to the addition of "Mixed" as an option in the 2011 census.

 Languages 
In the 2011 Census 2.3% of households in Chatteris reported to have no people in household who have English as a main language.

 Religion 
 
Christianity is the majority religion in Chatteris. From 2001 to 2011 it fell from 74.8% to 62.6%, partly due to a decrease in numbers but mostly due to population growth of which the majority have no religion. Despite the reduction in numbers the Christian population of Chatteris is above the average for England and Wales at 59.3%.

The parish church of St Peter & St Paul is situated in the centre of the town. A church has been on the site since at least 1162, although the current tower dates from 1352. The building had fallen into disrepair during the 19th century, and the majority of the building is the result of an intensive restoration in 1910. This included restoring a pitched roof and adding new aisles, although the nave arches are original. The church of St Peter & St Paul is a Grade I listed building. In 1935, a new two-manual Harrison & Harrison organ was installed, a fine example of a pneumatic action instrument. Recent years have seen the construction of several new facilities, such as the Bricstan room extension. The church lists itself as of the low church branch of the Church of England. The church also hosts Catholic Church services.

The Emmanuel Church in East Park Street was created through the union of the Methodist, United Reformed and Baptist Union churches in Chatteris in 1990. It is based in the former United Reformed building in East Park Street. Several former chapel buildings exist around the town. The town has a Salvation Army citadel, also in East Park Street, and a Grace Baptist church, founded in 2010 and called Chatteris Community Church, meets in the King Edward centre on King Edward Street.

 Migration 
The majority of the population of Chatteris was born within the UK. 6.4% of residents were born outside the UK, this is below the national average of 13%.

 Education 

The town has three primary schools, Kingsfield Primary School (created in 2003 by the amalgamation of the former Burnsfield School and King Edward School), Glebelands School, which opened in the early months of 1994 and Cromwell Primary which opened in 2021. Cromwell Community College is an all-through school admitting primary school and secondary school age pupils. It was founded in 1939. The Isle College used to have a presence in the town, with a base in Grove House. However, this closed following the college's merger with the College of West Anglia. The town has a library run by Cambridgeshire County Council.

 Healthcare 
Chatteris is serviced by George Clare GP Surgery and The Hollies Dental Practice.

Culture
Music
In 2005, British indie band Half Man Half Biscuitperhaps best known for "The Trumpton Riots" and "Dickie Davies Eyes"included a song entitled "For What Is Chatteris..." on their award-winning Achtung Bono album. The song extolled the virtues of the town, offset against how unsatisfying the best place in the world can suddenly become when the one you love is no longer there: "a market town that lacks quintessence / that's Chatteris without your presence". News of the song made the headlines of the Cambridgeshire Times and the Peterborough Evening Telegraph during September 2005, a month before the album's official release.

 Sport 
Fen skating was very popular in the past. An illustration from 1823 by George Cruikshank shows the Wisbech coach in the background of a skating match.

The town's football club, Chatteris Town, was founded in 1920 and currently play in the Kershaw Premier Division of the Cambridgeshire Football Association County League. 
The town also has a cricket club, Chatteris Cricket Club, which was founded in 1879. The club has five senior teams and four youth teams that compete in both the Fenland and Cambridgeshire leagues. Chatteris CC won the St Ivo Midweek League in 2008 and 2009 going both seasons unbeaten. 
The town also has a bowls club and a tennis club (St Peters). A flying school is also based at the airfield.North London Parachute Centre, URL accessed 21 March 2009

The town has one swimming pool, the Empress, which is privately owned and is a registered charity run by three trustees. It is open to members and can be booked for private hires or group sessions. It is home of the Chatteris Kingfishers swimming club, who after successes in 2008 compete in Division One of the 2009 "Cambs Cup" competition.  Plans for a public swimming pool and leisure centre have been proposed by the council since 1990, but have yet to be approved. Proposals for the development of Cromwell Community College under the government's BSF programme include significant leisure provisions and these are expected to start in 2010.Fenland District Council , URL accessed 18 May 2008
A new gym situated in the grounds of Cromwell Community College opened in 2013.

 Community activities and events 
The town is noted for its annual display of Christmas lights, which are entirely funded by community donations and have been featured on BBC Look East.Visit the Fens: Chatteris, URL accessed 21 August 2009 In 2008, a medieval-themed Historical Festival replaced the town's traditional festival week.Chatteris Historic Festival homepage , URL accessed 16 November 2010

The town has a museum run by volunteers, with several permanent exhibitions about local history, the Fens, Victoriana and the railways. Chatteris also has a Scout club, an Army Cadet Force and a youth football team.Chatteris Town Youth Football Club , URL accessed 21 May 2008

Chatteris has morning and evening Women's Institutes, which both meet at the King Edward Centre, and a Rotary Club which meet at the local fire station.

Since 2012 Chatteris has a branch of the University of the Third Age (U3A) which caters for people no longer in full time employment, with a talk every month at the general meeting held at the King Edward Centre, plus over 20 interest groups of various kinds, and a number of trips and theatre visits are also provided during the year.

Chatteris in Bloom is a charity responsible for entering the town in to the annual "Anglia in Bloom" competition. Chatteris achieved the highest gold award in 2017, 2018 and 2019.

The town has a brass band, founded in 1882, which competes in the East Anglian Brass Band Association."The sound of success" in the Fenland Citizen, 17 May 2006

 Notable residents 
 Eric Boon, boxer; British Lightweight Champion 1938–1944.
 George William Burdett Clare VC, Victoria Cross recipient after whom the doctors' surgery is named.
 Sir George Herbert Farrar, South African mining magnate, politician and soldier.
 John Percy Farrar, English soldier and mountaineer. President of the Alpine Club from 1917 to 1919 and a member of the Mount Everest Committee.
 John Dunn Gardner, MP and landowner, resident of Chatteris House. 
 Dave Boy Green, boxer.
 Dominic Mohan (former resident), former editor of The Sun'' newspaper.
 Joe Perry, snooker player.
 Joseph Ruston, engineer and MP.
 Lindsay Shilling, Principal Trombonist at the Royal Opera House.

See also 
 List of places in Cambridgeshire

References

Further reading

External links 

 Chatteris History Page
 2001 Census
 NOMIS statistics for Chatteris
 

 
Market towns in Cambridgeshire
Civil parishes in Cambridgeshire
Towns in Cambridgeshire
Fenland District